Kilden Performing Arts Centre (in Norwegian: Kilden teater og konserthus) is a theater and concert hall on Odderøya in Kristiansand, Norway. It  houses Kilden Teater, Kristiansand Symphony Orchestra (KSO) and Opera Sør in a joint project never previously embarked upon. There is room for a variety of concerts and other forms of cultural expression.

The Company 
The building is built and owned by the company "Kilden teater- og konserthus for Sørlandet IKS", and Kristiansand Municipality (80%) and Vest-Agder County (20%) are owners. The company was established in 2003 and the name Kilden (meaning "the source") specified in 2006.

The building 
Work on the building began in 2007, and Crown Princess Mette-Marit of Norway laid the foundation stone in 2009. The opening was officially finished 6 January 2012. Its architects were Finnish ALA Architects and Norwegian SMS Arkitekter, acoustical consultants were Brekke & Strand, the acoustic design of the concert hall was by Arup and the main contractor was AF group. The building has a gross area of 16,000 square meters and a volume of 128,000 cubic meters. The building cost nearly 1.7 billion Norwegian krones.

Halls 
The building has four stages:
Concert Hall with 1 185 seats
Theatre & Opera Hall with 708 seats, orchestra pit with space for 70 musicians
Multi-room with 234 seats or 400 standing
Intimate Hall with 150 seats

References

External links 

Official website, Kilden Performing Arts Centre 
Kilden Performing Arts Centre, www.visitnorway.com 
Program 
Dezeen Magazine (Artchitecture)
 

Music venues completed in 2012
2012 establishments in Norway
Modernist architecture in Norway
Theatres in Kristiansand
Concert halls in Norway
Music venues in Norway
Culture in Agder
Tourist attractions in Kristiansand
Buildings and structures in Kristiansand
Performing arts centres